Frederick I, Duke of Saxe-Gotha-Altenburg (15 July 1646 Gotha, Duchy of Saxe-Gotha – 2 August 1691 Friedrichswerth), was a duke of Saxe-Gotha-Altenburg. He was the fourth but eldest surviving son of Ernst I, Duke of Saxe-Coburg-Altenburg and Elisabeth Sophie of Saxe-Altenburg.

When Ernst inherited the duchy of Saxe-Altenburg (1672), he made Frederick the regent of that duchy. In 1674 Ernst, who was already ill, made Frederick the regent of his entire lands.

After the death of his father (1675) Frederick assumed the throne of both duchies. However, on the basis of his family's house law, he had to allow his six younger brothers to take part in the government. At first, they agreed to a common household of all seven brothers in the Schloss Friedenstein, though this arrangement endured only until 1676.

Afterwards, negotiations began for the division of the paternal inheritance. This was finally accomplished on 24 February 1680; Frederick kept Gotha, Tenneberg, Wachsenburg, Ichtershausen, Georgenthal, Schwarzwald, Reinhardsbrunn, Volkenrode, Oberkranichfeld, Orlamünde, Altenburg and Tonna. These towns virtually formed the old duchy of Saxe-Gotha-Altenburg. They consisted of three large and coherent areas around Gotha, Kahla and Altenburg, as well as six smaller enclaves.

Frederick continued the work of his father. In order to prevent future disputes between his descendants, he established primogeniture for his house in 1685 (with Imperial assent granted in 1688). Around 1680 he established himself in the Lustschloss Friedrichswerth, near the village of Erffa, approximately 20 km of Gotha, which was renamed in his honour Friedrichswerth.

In 1683 Frederick created the (still in existence today) Theatre of Gotha (Gothaer Schloßtheater). He was also an eager diary writer; these diaries became one of the most important sources of his time. Frederick took part in the Great Turkish War against the Turks, and in the War of the Grand Alliance against France. He ruined the finances of his small duchy, however, using them to maintain a standing army, which by the time of his death counted over 10,000 men.

Marriage and children
Frederick married firstly in Halle on 14 November 1669, Magdalena Sibylle of Saxe-Weissenfels. They had eight children:
 Anna Sophie (b. Gotha, 22 December 1670 – d. Rudolstadt, 28 December 1728), married on 15 October 1691 to Louis Frederick I, Prince of Schwarzburg-Rudolstadt.
 Magdalene Sibylle (b. Gotha, 30 September 1671 – d. Altenburg, 2 March 1673).
 Dorothea Marie (b. Gotha, 22 January 1674 – d. Meiningen, 18 April 1713), married on 19 September 1704 to Ernst Ludwig I, Duke of Saxe-Meiningen.
 Fredericka (b. Gotha, 24 March 1675 – d. Karlsbad, 28 May 1709), married on 25 May 1702 to Johann August, Prince of Anhalt-Zerbst.
 Frederick II, Duke of Saxe-Gotha-Altenburg (b. Gotha, 28 July 1676 – d. Altenburg, 23 March 1732).
 Johann Wilhelm (b. Gotha, 4 October 1677 – killed in battle, Toulon, 15 August 1707), General Imperial.
 Elisabeth (b. Gotha, 7 February 1679 – d. of smallpox, Gotha, 22 June 1680).
 Johanna (b. Gotha, 1 October 1680 – d. Strelitz, 9 July 1704), married on 20 June 1702 to Adolf Frederick II, Duke of Mecklenburg-Strelitz.

In Ansbach on 14 August 1681, Frederick married secondly Christine of Baden-Durlach. They had no children.

Ancestry

References

Die Tagebücher 1667-1686 (Publications of the Thuringian State Archives Gotha IV), edited by Roswitha Jacobsen. 3 volumes, Weimar 1998-2003.
Der alchemistische Nachlaß Friedrichs I. von Sachsen-Gotha-Altenburg (Quellen und Forschungen zur Alchemie 1), described by Oliver Humberg, Elberfeld 2005.
August Beck, Friedrich I., Herzog von Sachsen-Gotha und Altenburg. In: Allgemeine Deutsche Biographie (ADB). vol VIII. Duncker & Humblot, Leipzig 1878, p. 2.

1646 births
1691 deaths
People from Gotha (town)
People from Saxe-Gotha-Altenburg
Dukes of Saxe-Gotha-Altenburg
House of Saxe-Gotha-Altenburg